Yang Zihao (born 7 January 2001) is a Chinese footballer currently playing as a left-back for Tianjin Jinmen Tiger.

Club career
Yang Zihao would play for the Shanghai Shenxin and the Shanghai Port youth teams before he was loaned out to the China U19 team who were allowed to participate within the 2020 China League Two campaign. He would go on to make his debut in a league game against Zibo Cuju on 29 October 2020 in a 3-1 defeat where he came on as a substitute for Song Bowei. The following season he would be loaned out again, this time to top tier club Tianjin Jinmen Tiger where he made his debut in a league game on 11 May 2021 in a 1-0 defeat. Within that campaign he would also score his first goal on 17 May 2021, in a league game against Wuhan F.C. in a 2-1 victory. On 28 April 2022, Tianjin would officially make his move permanent before the start of the 2022 Chinese Super League season.

Career statistics
.

References

External links

2001 births
Living people
Chinese footballers
China youth international footballers
Association football midfielders
Chinese Super League players
Shanghai Port F.C. players
Tianjin Jinmen Tiger F.C. players